Thomas Covington Dent (March 20, 1932 – June 6, 1998) was an African-American poet and writer.

Early life and education
Thomas Dent was born on March 20, 1932, in New Orleans, Louisiana, to Albert W. Dent, president of Dillard University, and Ernestine Jessie Covington Dent, a concert pianist. He was the oldest of three sons. Thomas graduated from Oakwood School in 1948. He continued his education at Morehouse College receiving a bachelor's degree in political science in 1952. Thomas furthered his education at Syracuse University eventually receiving his doctorate in international studies in 1956.

Dent was a member of the U.S. Army for two years, 1957–59.

His published works included the book of poetry, Magnolia Street (1976) and Southern Journey: A Return to the Civil Rights Movement (1997). A collection of his work, New Orleans Griot: The Tom Dent Reader, edited by Kalamu Ya Salaam, was published in 2018. He was included into the American Poetry Since 1970 (Thunder's Mouth Press, 1990, ed. by Andrei Codrescu).

He was a passionate groomer of other Black writers and worked hard to sustain the Free Southern Theater writing workshop and Congo Square Writers' Union in his hometown of New Orleans and the Umbra Workshop on the Lower East Side in New York City.

Notes

External links
 Tom Dent's role in the organizational mentoring of African American Southern writers - African American Review

1932 births
1998 deaths
Writers from Louisiana
African-American poets
Morehouse College alumni
American male poets
20th-century American poets
20th-century American male writers
20th-century African-American writers
African-American male writers